Bani Mansour is a rural sub-district in Ba'dan District, Ibb Governorate, Yemen.

According to the 2004 Yemeni Census, the population of the sub-district was 8,899 residents.

As of 2014, the population of Beni Mansour reached 11,959.

References 

Sub-districts in Ba'dan District
Populated places in Ibb Governorate